The Whisperers is a 1967 British drama film directed by Bryan Forbes and starring Edith Evans. It is based on the 1961 novel by Robert Nicolson. Star Edith Evans received many honours for her leading performance, including her third Oscar nomination.

Plot 
Mrs Margaret Ross, an impoverished, elderly, eccentric woman, is living in a ground floor flat, in an unnamed town in northern England. Aged 76, she is dependent on National Assistance from the British government. She is visited by her criminal son, who hides a package containing a large sum of money in her unused spare room. The son confesses to the police of his robbery, then is sent to jail. Meanwhile, Mrs Ross finds the money. Thinking the money is a windfall intended for her, Mrs Ross makes elaborate plans. She casually confides to a stranger, who befriends her in order to ply her with spirits, kidnap her, then rob her of the stolen money. Rendered drunk and abandoned to the elements by her captors, Mrs Ross contracts pneumonia. She is found by neighbours, then after almost dying, recovers in a hospital. It is the first time anyone has cared for her in years. Doctors, nurses, psychiatrists, and social workers all focus on her case. An agent at the National Assistance bureau traces down her husband, Archie (who deserted her decades ago). Motivated by the agent, who threatens him with legal pressure, informing him of his legal responsibility to her, the husband is strongly encouraged to move back in with her, which he does. Soon, he becomes involved with gamblers, then steals their money at a chance opportunity, which forces him to flee, so he deserts her again. Having been on the verge of a return to functional living, Mrs Ross resumes her lonely status as an isolated person, who talks to the walls. This movie depicts these events as occurring during the year 1966, the year that British National Assistance was replaced by Supplementary Benefit.

Cast

 Edith Evans – Mrs Ross
 Eric Portman – Archie Ross
 Nanette Newman – Girl Upstairs
 Harry Baird – Man Upstairs
 Jack Austin – Police Sergeant
 Gerald Sim – Mr Conrad
 Lionel Gamlin – Mr Conrad's Colleague
 Glen Farmer – 1st Redeemer
 Oliver MacGreevy – 2nd Redeemer
 Ronald Fraser – Charlie Ross
 Kenneth Griffith – Mr Weaver
 Avis Bunnage – Mrs Noonan
 John Orchard – Grogan
 Peter Thompson – Publican
 Sarah Forbes – Mrs Ross when young
 Kaplan Kaye – Jimmie Noonan
 Penny Spencer – Mavis Noonan
 Robin Bailey – Psychiatrist
 Leonard Rossiter – Assistance Board Officer
 Margaret Tyzack – Hospital Almoner
 Frank Singuineau – Doctor

 Mr Noonan – Micheal Robbins

Production

Filming location
Although the fictional setting of the film is not named, it was mainly shot on location in the Lancashire town of Oldham, a once-thriving textile centre near Manchester which by 1967 had fallen into decline.

Release

Awards
Edith Evans was nominated for the Academy Award for Best Actress, and won the BAFTA Award, the Silver Bear for Best Actress award at the 17th Berlin International Film Festival, the National Board of Review award, the New York Film Critics Circle award, and the Golden Globe Award all for Best Actress.

Home media
Announced by Kino Lorber Studio Classics on Facebook on 14 March 2019 that a new 2K scan would be coming soon. This Blu-ray will be released on 14 January 2020.

References

External links

1967 films
1967 drama films
Films featuring a Best Drama Actress Golden Globe-winning performance
Films based on British novels
Films directed by Bryan Forbes
British black-and-white films
Films shot at Pinewood Studios
Films scored by John Barry (composer)
British drama films
Films produced by Michael Laughlin
Social realism in film
Films shot in Greater Manchester
1960s English-language films
1960s British films